Hreðavatn is a lake in the west of Iceland. It is situated near Route 1 (the Ring Road) between Borgarnes and the pass of Holtavörtuheiði. Nearby is the university faculty of Bifröst and the Grábrók craters as well as the mountain Baula.

The surface of the lake is 1.14 km², it lies 56 m above sea level, its length is about 5 km and its greatest depth 20 m.  It is embedded in a scenic landscape of heath and small forest plantations.

See also
List of lakes of Iceland

External links
https://web.archive.org/web/20040529132132/http://www.nat.is/nateng/hredavatn.htm
https://web.archive.org/web/20040620053013/http://iww.is/pages/xw/wl.html (w.Photo)

Borgarbyggð
Lakes of Iceland